Montelabbate is a comune (municipality) in the Province of Pesaro e Urbino in the Italian region Marche, located about  northwest of Ancona and about  southwest of Pesaro. 
 
Montelabbate borders the following municipalities: Colbordolo,  Pesaro, Sant'Angelo in Lizzola, Tavullia, Urbino, Vallefoglia.

References

External links
 Official website

Cities and towns in the Marche